The women's 10 kilometres walk event at the 1994 Commonwealth Games was held in Victoria, British Columbia.

Results

References

Walk
1994
1994 in women's athletics